Francis Xavier Pattison (born 29 September 1928) is a former Australian rules footballer who played with St Kilda in the Victorian Football League (VFL).

Pattison is the son of former Carlton, Fitzroy and Richmond player Andy Pattison.

Notes

External links 

Living people
1928 births
Australian rules footballers from Victoria (Australia)
St Kilda Football Club players